Beau Sandland (born February 23, 1993) is a former American football tight end. He played college football at Montana State.

Professional career

Carolina Panthers
Sandland was drafted by the Carolina Panthers in the seventh round, 252nd overall, of the 2016 NFL Draft. On September 3, 2016, he was waived by the Panthers as part of final roster cuts. The next day he was signed to the Panthers' practice squad. He was released by the Panthers on November 9, 2016.

Green Bay Packers
On November 11, 2016, Sandland was signed to the Green Bay Packers' practice squad. He signed a futures contract with the Packers on January 24, 2017. He was placed on injured reserve on August 13, 2017. On August 18, 2017, he was released from injured reserve.

Arizona Cardinals
On April 16, 2018, Sandland signed with the Arizona Cardinals. He was waived by the Cardinals on July 20, 2018 with a non-football injury designation.

References

External links
Montana State bio

Living people
1993 births
American football tight ends
People from Simi Valley, California
Players of American football from California
Sportspeople from Ventura County, California
Miami Hurricanes football players
Pierce Brahmas football players
Montana State Bobcats football players
Carolina Panthers players
Green Bay Packers players
Arizona Cardinals players